Aldor is a programming language. It is the successor of A# as the extension language of the Axiom computer algebra system.

Aldor combines imperative, functional, and object-oriented features. It has an elaborate type system, allowing types to be used as first-class values. Aldor's syntax is heavily influenced by Pascal, but it is optionally indentation-sensitive, using whitespace characters and the off-side rule, like Python. In its current implementation, it is compiled, but an interactive listener is provided.

Aldor is distributed as free and open-source software, under the Apache License 2.0.

Examples 

The Hello world program looks like this:
#include "aldor"
#include "aldorio"

stdout << "Hello, world!" << newline;

Example of dependent types (from the User Guide):
#include "aldor"
#include "aldorio"
#pile

sumlist(R: ArithmeticType, l: List R): R == 
    s: R := 0;
    for x in l repeat s := s + x
    s

import from List Integer, Integer, List SingleFloat, SingleFloat
stdout << sumlist(Integer, [2,3,4,5]) << newline
stdout << sumlist(SingleFloat, [2.0, 2.1, 2.2, 2.4]) << newline

99 Bottles of Beer:
#include "aldor"
#include "aldorio"

import from Integer, String;

bob(n: Integer): String == {
    b: String := " bottle";

    if n ~= 1 then b := b + "s";
    b + " of beer";
}

main(): == {
    n: Integer := 99;
    otw: String := " on the wall";

    -- refrain
    while n > 0 repeat {
        stdout << n << bob(n) << otw << ", " << n << bob(n) << "." << newline;
        stdout << "Take one down and pass it around, ";
        n := n - 1;
        if n > 0 then stdout << n;
        else stdout << "no more";
        stdout << bob(n) << otw << "." << newline;
        stdout << newline;
    }

    -- last verse
    stdout << "No more" << bob(n) << otw << ", no more" << bob(n) << "." << newline;
    stdout << "Go to the store and buy some more, ";
    n: Integer := 99;
    stdout << n << bob(n) << otw << "." << newline;
}

main();

References

External links 
 
 Open Source Development - Git repository
 Aldor User Guide

Experimental programming languages
Object-oriented programming languages